The First Battle of Donaldsonville took place on August 9, 1862, in Ascension Parish, Louisiana, as part of the Operations against Baton Rouge in the American Civil War.

A number of incidents of artillery firing on Union steamers passing up and down the Mississippi River at Donaldsonville, Louisiana, influenced the U.S. Navy to undertake a retaliatory attack. Rear Adm. David G. Farragut sent the town notice of his intentions and suggested that the citizens send the women and children away. He then anchored in front of the town and fired upon it with guns and mortars. Farragut also sent a detachment ashore that set fire to the hotels, wharf buildings, and the dwelling houses and other buildings of Capt. Phillippe Landry. Landry, thought to be the captain of the partisan unit, purportedly fired on the landing party during the raid. Some citizens protested the raid, but, generally, firing on Union ships ceased thereafter.

See also
Second Battle of Donaldsonville

References

Operations against Baton Rouge (American Civil War)
Battles of the Lower Seaboard Theater and Gulf Approach of the American Civil War
Union victories of the American Civil War
Donaldsonville I
Battle of Donaldsonville
Battle
1862 in Louisiana
August 1862 events
1862 in the American Civil War